Mohammad Ali Tarkai is a Pakistani politician from Swabi District who had been a member of the Khyber Pakhtunkhwa Assembly from August 2018 till January 2023 and belongs to the Pakistan Tehreek-e-Insaf. He won this constituency for the second time in a row in the 2018 provincial election.

Political career
Ali was elected as the member of the Khyber Pakhtunkhwa Assembly on ticket of Awami Jamhuri Ittehad Pakistan (later merged to Pakistan Tehreek-e-Insaf) from PK-33 (Swabi-III) in 2013 Pakistani general election.

Ali in the 2018 Pakistani general elections was re-elected on PTI's ticket from his own constituency PK-46 (Swabi-IV) defeating ANP Candidate Ayaz Ali.

References

Living people
Year of birth missing (living people)
Pashtun people
Pakistan Tehreek-e-Insaf MPAs (Khyber Pakhtunkhwa)
Khyber Pakhtunkhwa MPAs 2013–2018
People from Swabi District